Jane Leslie Conly (born 1948) is an American author, the daughter of author Robert C. O'Brien. She started her literary work by finishing the manuscript for her father's Z for Zachariah in 1974 after his death.

Her first own book, Racso and the Rats of NIMH, was published in 1986, and is a sequel to her father's Mrs. Frisby and the Rats of NIMH.

Education 
Conly graduated from Woodrow Wilson High School in 1966 and from Smith College in 1971.

Personal life 
Conly lives in Baltimore, Maryland with her family: Peter, her husband; Eliza, her daughter; and Will, her son.

Awards 
 1994 Newbery Honor for Crazy Lady!
 2012–2012 Dorothy Canfield Fisher Children's Book Award Master List for Murder Afloat

Works 

1986: Racso and the Rats of NIMH, illustrated by Leonard Lubin (Harper & Row) – Children's Choice IRA, 1987
1990: R-T, Margaret, and the Rats of NIMH, illus. Leonard Lubin – Children's Choice IRA, 1990
1993: Crazy Lady! – Newbery Honor Book, ALA Best Books for Young Adults, 1994
1995: Trout Summer – ALA Best Books for Young Adults, 1996
1998: While No One Was Watching
1999: What Happened on Planet Kid
2002: The Rudest Alien on Earth
2005: In the Night, on Lanvale Street
 2008: Impetuous R, Secret Agent, illus. Bonnie Leck
2010: Murder Afloat

References

External links 

 
 

1948 births
Living people
American children's writers
Newbery Honor winners
Smith College alumni
Writers from Baltimore
Date of birth missing (living people)
Place of birth missing (living people)